Gentile Dolfin (died  1601) was a Roman Catholic prelate, member of the Delfin family, who served as Bishop of Camerino (1596–1601).

Biography
On 18 December 1596, Gentile was appointed during the papacy of Pope Clement VIII as Bishop of Camerino.
He served as Bishop of Camerino until his death on 4 March 1601.

References

External links and additional sources
 (for Chronology of Bishops) 
 (for Chronology of Bishops) 

16th-century Italian Roman Catholic bishops
17th-century Italian Roman Catholic bishops
Bishops appointed by Pope Clement VIII
1508 deaths